Kanye West is an American rapper, record producer, director, fashion designer, and songwriter. He has received various awards and nominations for his work in each of the aforementioned fields. West rose to prominence in the early 2000s, earning several honors for his work as a producer. He transitioned to become a recording artist, and won Best New Male Artist at both the 2004 World Music Awards and 2004 Billboard Music Awards. The same year, West released his debut album The College Dropout (2004). The album won several awards, and helped West receive the third most Grammy nominations in one night (10) at the 47th Annual Grammy Awards. The album won Best Rap Album, while its single "Jesus Walks" won Best Rap Song. The latter would elsewhere win Best Male Video at the 2005 MTV Video Music Awards.

West's second studio album Late Registration (2005) received the joint-most nominations at the 48th Annual Grammy Awards, with eight. He took home three awards, and became only the second artist to win Best Rap Album back-to-back, as well as the first artist to win Best Rap Song in consecutive years. In the same year, he won Best International Male at the 2006 Meteor Awards. West received the most nominations at the 50th Annual Grammy Awards for his third studio album Graduation (2007), with eight. The album won in four out of the five rap categories, and West became the first solo artist to have his first three studio albums be nominated for Album of the Year.

West's fourth studio album 808s & Heartbreak (2008) was nominated for Album of the Year at the 2009 Soul Train Music Awards, and featured the single "Love Lockdown", which received three nominations at the 2009 MTV Video Music Awards, including Video of the Year. Elsewhere in 2009, West won a record-equalling third Brit Award for International Male Solo Artist. West's fifth studio album My Beautiful Dark Twisted Fantasy (2010), and collaborative album Watch The Throne (2011) with Jay-Z earned him the most nominations at the 54th Annual Grammy Awards—seven, of which he won four. He repeated the feat a year later, when he led (jointly) the Grammy nominees for a fifth time at the 55th Annual Grammy Awards, taking home three awards.

The compilation album Cruel Summer (2012) was released by the label GOOD Music, which West founded, and led to him receiving a record seventeen nominations at the 2012 BET Hip Hop Awards. His sixth solo album Yeezus (2013) received a nomination for Best Album at the 2014 NME Awards. In 2015, West won Shoe of the Year for the Yeezy Boost at the Footwear News Achievement Awards. He also became only the second rapper to receive the MTV Video Vanguard Award, in addition to receiving the Visionary Award at The BET Honors. West's seventh solo studio album The Life of Pablo (2016) released alongside his Yeezy Season 3 fashion show, won him Artist of the Year at the 20th Annual Webby Awards, along with two Clio Awards in fashion and marketing. The album's merchandise (released via a pop-up project across 21 cities) earned West a nomination at the 2017 Beazley Designs of the Year. In 2018, West earned his first Grammy nomination for Producer of the Year, Non-Classical at the 61st Annual Grammy Awards. His eighth studio album Ye (2018) was nominated for Best Foreign Hip-Hop Album at the 2019 Hungarian Music Awards. West's 2019 album Jesus Is King and single "Follow God" gave him wins at the 51st GMA Dove Awards, as well as his first in the Christian/Gospel categories at the 2020 Billboard Music Awards. At the 64th Annual Grammy Awards, West equalled the record for most Grammys won by a hip-hop artist (24).

ACE Awards
The Accessories Council Excellence Awards were created in 1997 to pay homage to those individuals and groups that have made great strides in raising the awareness of the accessories industry. West has received one award.

!
|-
| 2010
| Kanye West
| Stylemaker Award	
| 
| style="text-align:center;"|
|}

AEC Awards
The Artist Empowerment Coalition Awards recognizes those who understand the importance of giving back to their community, while encouraging others along the way to do the same. Honoree's are awarded for their individual contributions. West has received one award.

!
|-
| 2005
| Kanye West
| Making a Difference  	
| 
| style="text-align:center;"|
|}

American Music Awards
The American Music Awards is an annual music awards show created by Dick Clark in 1973. West has received three awards from twelve nominations.

!
|-
| rowspan="3"| 2004
| The College Dropout
| Favorite Rap/Hip-Hop Album
| 
| rowspan="3" align="center"|
|-
| rowspan="5"| Kanye West
| Favorite Breakthrough Artist
| 
|-
| rowspan="2"| Favorite Rap/Hip-Hop Male Artist
| 
|-
| rowspan="2"| 2006
| 
| rowspan="2" align="center"|
|-
| Favorite Pop/Rock Male Artist
| 
|-
| rowspan="2"| 2008
| Favorite Rap/Hip-Hop Male Artist
| 
| rowspan="2" align="center"|
|-
| Graduation (album)|Graduation
| rowspan="2"| Favorite Rap/Hip-Hop Album
| 
|-
| rowspan="2"| 2011
|Watch The Throne
| 
| rowspan="2" align="center"|
|-
| Kanye West
| Favorite Rap/Hip-Hop Artist
| 
|-
| 2015
| "FourFiveSeconds" (with Rihanna & Paul McCartney)
| Collaboration of the Year
| 
| align="center"|
|-
| 2020
| rowspan="2"| Kanye West
| Favorite Contemporary Inspirational Artist
| 
| align="center"|
|-
| 2021
| Favorite Artist – Gospel
| 
| align="center"|
|}

Antville Music Video Awards
The Antville Awards are annual online awards that recognize the best music videos of the past year. West has received three awards from nineteen nominations.

!
|-
| 2005
| "Gold Digger"
| Best Video
| 
| align="center"|
|-
| 2007
| "Can't Tell Me Nothing"
| Most Fun Video
| 
| align="center"|
|-
| rowspan="2" |2008
| rowspan="2"| "Flashing Lights"
| Best Narrative Video
| 
| rowspan="2" align="center"|
|-
| Best Urban Video
| 
|-
| rowspan="3" | 2009
| rowspan="3" | "Welcome to Heartbreak"
| Best Performance Video
| 
| rowspan="3" align="center"|
|-
| Hype Williams Award
| 
|-
| Best Music Video of the Year
| 
|-
| rowspan="3" | 2010
| Kanye West
| Best Commissioning Artist
| 
| rowspan="3" align="center"|
|-
| "Runaway"
| Best Cinematography
| 
|-
| "Power"
| rowspan="2" | Most Fun Video
| 
|-
| rowspan="4" | 2011
| rowspan="3"| "Otis" (with Jay-Z)
| 
| rowspan="4" align="center"|
|-
| Best Performance Video
| 
|-
| rowspan="2"| Best Hip-Hop Video
| 
|-
| "Monster"
| 
|-
| rowspan="3"| 2012
| rowspan="2"| "No Church in the Wild" (with Jay-Z)
| Best Cinematography
| 
| rowspan="3" align="center"|
|-
| rowspan="4"| Best Hip-Hop Video
| 
|-
| "Niggas in Paris" (with Jay-Z)
| 
|-
| rowspan="2"| 2013
| "Bound 2"
| 
| rowspan="2" align="center"|
|-
| "Black Skinhead"
| 
|}

ARIA Music Awards
The ARIA Music Awards is an annual awards ceremony that recognises excellence, innovation, and achievement across all genres of Australian music. 

! 
|-
! scope="row"| 2021
| Kanye West Donda
| rowspan="2"| ARIA Award for Best International Artist
| 
| 
|-

BEFFTA Awards
The BEFFTA Awards celebrate and reward the achievements of black personalities within entertainment, film, fashion, television and arts. West has received two nominations.

!
|-
| 2014
| rowspan="2"| Kanye West
| rowspan="2"| Best International Act
| 
| style="text-align:center;|
|-
| 2016
| 
| style="text-align:center;|
|}

Best Art Vinyl Awards
The Best Art Vinyl Awards are yearly awards established in 2005 by Art Vinyl Ltd to celebrate the best album artwork of the past year. West has received two nominations.

!
|-
| 2005
| Late Registration
| rowspan="2"| Best Vinyl Art
| 
| style="text-align:center;|
|-
| 2011
| Watch The Throne
| 
| style="text-align:center;|
|}

BET Awards

BET Awards
The BET Awards were established in 2001 by the Black Entertainment Television network to celebrate Black Americans and other minorities in music, acting, sports, and other fields of entertainment over the past year. West has received ten awards from thirty-seven nominations.

!
|-
| rowspan="4"| 2004
| "All Falls Down" (featuring Syleena Johnson)
| Viewer's Choice
| 
| rowspan=4 align="center"|
|-
| "Slow Jamz" (with Twista & Jamie Foxx)
| Best Collaboration
| 
|-
| rowspan="4"| Kanye West
| Best New Artist
|
|-
| rowspan="2"| Best Male Hip-Hop Artist
|
|-
| rowspan="3"| 2005
| 
| rowspan=3 align="center"|
|-
| Best Gospel Artist
| 
|-
| "Jesus Walks"
| rowspan="2"| Video of the Year
| 
|-
| rowspan="3"| 2006
| rowspan="2"| "Gold Digger" (featuring Jamie Foxx)
| 
| rowspan=3 align="center"|
|-
| Best Collaboration
| 
|-
| rowspan="2"| Kanye West
| rowspan="2"| Best Male Hip-Hop Artist
| 
|-
| rowspan="3"| 2008
| 
| rowspan=3 align="center"|
|-
| rowspan="2"| Good Life (featuring T-Pain)
| Best Collaboration
|
|-
| rowspan="2"| Video of the Year
| 
|-
| rowspan="3"| 2009
| "Heartless"
| 
| rowspan=3 align="center"|
|-
| "Love Lockdown"
| Viewer's Choice
| 
|-
| Kanye West
| Best Male Hip Hop Artist
| 
|-
| 2010
| "Forever" (with Drake, Lil Wayne & Eminem)
| rowspan="2"| Best Collaboration
| 
| align="center"|
|-
| rowspan="4"| 2011
| "All of the Lights" (featuring Rihanna)
| 
| rowspan=4 align="center"|
|-
| "Runaway"
| Video of the Year
| 
|-
| rowspan="3"| Kanye West
| Best Male Hip-Hop Artist
| 
|-
| rowspan="2"| Video Director of the Year
| 
|-
| rowspan="7"| 2012
| 
| rowspan=7 align="center"|
|-
| rowspan="3"| "Otis" (with Jay-Z)
| Best Collaboration
| 
|-
| Viewer's Choice
| 
|-
| rowspan="2"| Video of the Year
| 
|-
| "Niggas in Paris" (with Jay-Z)
| 
|-
| "Marvin & Chardonnay" 
| Best Collaboration
| 
|-
| rowspan="2"| The Throne  (with Jay-Z)
| rowspan="2"| Best Group
| 
|-
| rowspan="3"| 2013
| 
| rowspan=3 align="center"|
|-
| rowspan="2"|"Mercy"  (featuring Big Sean, Pusha T & 2 Chainz)
| Video Of The Year
| 
|-
| rowspan="2"| Best Collaboration
| 
|-
| rowspan="2"| 2016
| "One Man Can Change the World" (with Big Sean & John Legend)
| 
| rowspan=2 align="center"|
|-
| Kanye West
| Best Male Hip Hop Artist
| 
|-
| 2020
| "Follow God"
| rowspan="2"| Best Gospel/Inspirational Award
| 
| style="text-align:center;"|
|-
| rowspan="3"| 2022
| "Come to Life"
| 
| rowspan="3" align="center"|
|-
| Kanye West
| Best Male Hip Hop Artist
| 
|-
| Donda
| Album of the Year
| 
|}

BET Hip Hop Awards
The BET Hip Hop Awards are hosted annually by BET for hip hop performers, producers, and music video directors. West has received nineteen awards from eighty-seven nominations.

!
|-
| rowspan="3"| 2006
| Late Registration
| Hip Hop CD of the Year
| 
| rowspan="3" align="center"|
|-
| rowspan="5"| Kanye West
| Producer of the Year
| 
|-
| rowspan="2"| Best Live Performance
| 
|-
| rowspan="4"|2007
| 
| rowspan="4" align="center"|
|-
| Lyricist of the Year
| 
|-
| Producer of the Year
| 
|-
| "Stronger"
| rowspan="2"| Best Hip-Hop Video
| 
|-
| rowspan="8"| 2008
| rowspan="3"| "Good Life" (featuring T-Pain)
| 
| rowspan="8" align="center"|
|-
|Track of the Year
|
|-
| Best Hip-Hop Collabo
|
|-
| rowspan="3"| Kanye West
| Best Lyricist
| 
|-
| MVP of the Year
| 
|-
| Best Live Performer
|
|-
| Graduation
| CD of the Year
| 
|-
| rowspan="2"| "Put On" (with Young Jeezy)
| People's Champ
| 
|-
| rowspan="9"| 2009
| Best Hip-Hop Collabo
| 
| rowspan="9" align="center"|
|-
| 808s & Heartbreak
| CD of the Year
| 
|-
| "Amazing" (featuring Young Jeezy)
| People's Champ Award
| 
|-
| rowspan="8"| Kanye West
| Best Live Performer
| 
|-
| Lyricist of the Year
| 
|-
| Producer of the Year
| 
|-
| MVP of the Year
| 
|-
| Hustler of the Year
| 
|-
| rowspan="2"| Best Hip Hop Style
| 
|-
| rowspan="3"| 2010
| 
| rowspan="3" align="center"|
|-
| Best Live Performer
| 
|-
| "Forever" (with Drake, Lil Wayne & Eminem)
| Perfect Combo
| 
|-
| rowspan="10"| 2011
| rowspan="2"| "All of the Lights" (featuring Rihanna)
| Best Hip-Hop Video
| 
| rowspan="10" align="center"|
|-
| Viewer's Choice
| 
|-
| My Beautiful Dark Twisted Fantasy
| CD of the Year
| 
|-
| rowspan="14" |Kanye West
| Best Live Performer
| 
|-
| Hustler of the Year
| 
|-
| Best Hip-Hop Style
| 
|-
| Lyricist of the Year
| 
|-
| Video Director of the Year
| 
|-
| MVP of the Year
| 
|-
| rowspan="2"| Producer of the Year
| 
|-
| rowspan="17"| 2012
| 
| rowspan="17" align="center"|
|-
| Lyricist of the Year
| 
|-
| MVP of the Year
| 
|-
| Best Live Performer
| 
|-
| Hustler of the Year
| 
|-
| Best Hip-Hop Style
| 
|-
| Video Director of the Year
| 
|-
| rowspan="4"|"Mercy" (featuring Big Sean, Pusha T & 2 Chainz)
| Best Club Banger
| 
|-
| Reese's Perfect Combo Award
| 
|-
| Best Hip-Hop Video
| 
|-
| rowspan="2"| People's Champ Award
| 
|-
| Otis (with Jay-Z)
| 
|-
| Watch The Throne
| CD of the Year
| 
|-
| rowspan="2"| "Niggas In Paris" (with Jay-Z)
| Track of the Year
| 
|-
| Best Club Banger
| 
|-
| The Throne (with Jay-Z)
| Best Live Performer
| 
|-
| "Murder to Excellence" (with Jay-Z)
| rowspan="2"| Impact Track
| 
|-
| rowspan="4"| 2013
| "Black Skinhead"
| 
| rowspan="4" align="center"|
|-
| rowspan="8"| Kanye West
| Best Hip-Hop Style
| 
|-
| Hustler of the Year
| 
|-
| rowspan="2"| Best Live Performer
| 
|-
| rowspan="2"| 2014
|
| rowspan="2" align="center"|
|-
| rowspan="2"| Best Hip-Hop Style
| 
|-
| rowspan="9"| 2015
| 
| rowspan="9" align="center"|
|-
| Producer of the Year
| 
|-
| Best Live Performer
| 
|-
| rowspan="3"| "Blessings" (with Big Sean & Drake)
| Best Collabo, Duo or Group
| 
|-
| People's Champ Award
| 
|-
| Best Hip Hop Video
| 
|-
| rowspan="2"|"I Don't Fuck with You" (as producer)
| Best Club Banger
| 
|-
| Track of the Year
| 
|-
| "One Man Can Change The World" (with Big Sean & John Legend)
| Impact Track
| 
|-
| rowspan="8"| 2016
| rowspan="6"| Kanye West
| Best Live Performer
| 
| rowspan="8" align="center"|
|-
| Lyricist of the Year
| 
|-
| Video Director of the Year
| 
|-
| MVP of the Year
| 
|-
| Hustler of the Year
| 
|-
| Best Hip-Hop Style
| 
|-
| "Famous" (featuring Rihanna)
| Best Hip Hop Video
| 
|-
| The Life of Pablo
| Album of the Year
| 
|-
| rowspan="10"| 2022
| rowspan="3"| Hot Shit (with Cardi B & Lil Durk)
| Best Hip Hop Video
| 
| rowspan="10" align="center"|
|-
| Best Collaboration
| 
|-
| Song of the Year
| 
|-
| rowspan="2"| City of Gods
| Sweet 16: Best Featured Verse
| 
|-
| Impact Track
| 
|-
| Donda
| Album of the Year
| 
|-
| rowspan="4"| Kanye West 
| Producer of the Year 
| 
|-
| Best Live Performer
| 
|-
| Hustler of the Year
| 
|-
| Hip Hop Artist of the Year
| 
|}

BET Honors
BET Honors were established in 2008 by the Black Entertainment Television network to grace the lives and achievements of African-American luminaries. The awards are presented annually during Black History Month. West has received one award.

!
|-
| 2015
| Kanye West
| Visionary Award
| 
| style="text-align:center;"|
|}

Billboard Awards

Billboard.com Mid-Year Music Awards
The Billboard.com Mid-Year Music Awards are held by Billboard to recognize the most favorite artists, songs, albums and performances of the first half of the year. Winners are selected through a poll on Billboards official website. West has received four nominations.

!
|-
| 2011
| Kanye West at Coachella
| Best Festival Performance
| 
|style="text-align:center;"|
|-
| 2012
| Kanye West's GOOD Music Album The best album of the year
| Most Anticipated Event of 2012's Second Half
| 
|style="text-align:center;"|
|-
| rowspan="2"| 2013
| Kanye West at Governors Ball
| Best Festival Performance
| 
| rowspan="2" align="center"|
|-
| Kanye West Projects New Song on Buildings Around The World
| Coolest Marketing Stunt
| 
|}

Billboard Music Awards
The Billboard Music Awards are held to honor artists for commercial performance in the U.S., based on record charts published by Billboard. West has received seventeen awards from forty nominations.

!
|-
|rowspan="8"| 2004
| The College Dropout
| R&B/Hip-Hop Album of the Year
| 
| rowspan="8" style="text-align:center;"|
|-
| rowspan="8"| Kanye West
| R&B/Hip-Hop Singles Artist of the Year
| 
|-
| R&B/Hip-Hop Artist of the Year
| 
|-
| Hot 100 Songwriter of the Year
| 
|-
| R&B/Hip-Hop producer of the year
| 
|-
| Rap Artist of the Year
| 
|-
| New R&B/Hip-Hop Artist of the Year
| 
|-
| New Male Artist of the Year
| 
|-
| 2005
| Artist Achievement Award
| 
| style="text-align:center;"|
|-
| 2011
| My Beautiful Dark Twisted Fantasy
| Top Rap Album
| 
| style="text-align:center;"|
|-
| rowspan="4"| 2012
| rowspan="3"| "E.T." (with Katy Perry)
| Top Digital Song
| 
| rowspan="4" align="center"|
|-
| Top Hot 100 Song
| 
|-
| Top Pop Song
| 
|-
| Watch The Throne (with Jay-Z)
| Top Rap Album
| 
|-
| 2013
| "Mercy" (featuring Big Sean, Pusha T & 2 Chainz)
| Top Rap Song
| 
| style="text-align:center;"|
|-
| 2017
| rowspan="3"| Kanye West
| Top Rap Tour
| 
| style="text-align:center;"|
|-
| rowspan="9"| 2020
| Top Gospel Artist 
| 
| rowspan="9" align="center"|
|-
| Top Christian Artist 
| 
|-
| rowspan="2"| Jesus Is King
| Top Gospel Album 
| 
|-
| Top Christian Album
|  
|-
| rowspan="2"| "Follow God"
| Top Christian Song 
|  
|-
| rowspan="4"| Top Gospel Song
|  
|-
| "Selah"
|  
|-
| "On God"
|  
|-
| "Closed on Sunday"
|  
|-
| rowspan="2"| 2021
| Kanye West
| Top Gospel Artist 
| 
| rowspan="2" align="center"|
|-
| "Wash Us in the Blood" (featuring Travis Scott)
| Top Gospel Song
| 
|-
| rowspan="13"| 2022
| Top Christian Artist
| rowspan="2"| Kanye West
|  
| rowspan="13" align="center"| 
|-
| Top Gospel Artist
|  
|-
| rowspan="3"| Donda
| Top Rap Album
|  
|-
| Top Christian Album
|  
|-
| Top Gospel Album
|  
|-
| “Moon”
| rowspan="4"| Top Christian Song
|  
|-
| “Off the Grid”
|  
|-
| "Praise God"
|  
|-
| rowspan="2"| “Hurricane”
|  
|-
| rowspan="4"| Top Gospel Song
|  
|-
| “Moon”
|  
|-
| “Off the Grid”
|  
|-
| "Praise God"
|  
|}

Billboard R&B/Hip-Hop Awards
The Billboard R&B/Hip-Hop Awards honored the most popular albums, songs, artists, songwriters, producers and major/independent labels. The awards were based on sales data from Nielsen SoundScan and radio airplay information from Nielsen Broadcast Data Systems. West received two awards from eleven nominations.

!
|-
| rowspan="3"| 2004
| rowspan="7"| Kanye West
| Top Songwriter
| 
| rowspan="3" align="center"|
|-
| Top New R&B/Hip-Hop Artist
| 
|-
| rowspan="2"| Top Producer
| 
|-
| 2005
| 
| style="text-align:center;"|
|-
| rowspan="7"| 2006
| Top R&B/Hip-Hop Artist
| 
| rowspan="7" style="text-align:center;"|
|-
| Top Male R&B/Hip-Hop Artist
| 
|-
| Hot R&B/Hip-Hop Albums Artist
| 
|-
| rowspan="2"| Late Registration
| Top R&B/Hip-Hop Album
| 
|-
| Top Rap Album
| 
|-
| rowspan="2"| "Gold Digger" (featuring Jamie Foxx)
| Hot R&B/Hip-Hop Song
| 
|-
| Hot Rap Track
| 
|}

Billboard R&B/Hip-Hop Power Players Event
The Billboard R&B/Hip-Hop Power Players Event honors the Top 100 artists and executives who are driving, influencing and defining hip-hop culture today. West has received two awards.

!
|-
| 2017
| rowspan="2"| Kanye West
| rowspan="2"| Labels (CEO, G.O.O.D. Music)
| 
| style="text-align:center;"|
|-
| 2018
| 
| style="text-align:center;"|
|}

Black Reel Awards
The Black Reel Awards is an awards ceremony hosted by the Foundation for the Augmentation of African-Americans in Film (FAAAF), and annually spotlights black cinematic excellence in films and performances in theatrical, independent, television and world cinema films. West has received two nominations.

!
|-
| |2011
| |"Run This Town" (with Jay-Z & Rihanna)
| rowspan="2"| Best Original or Adapted Song
| 
| style="text-align:center;"|
|-
| |2013
| |"No Church in the Wild"  (with Jay-Z & Frank Ocean)
| 
| style="text-align:center;"|
|}

BMI Awards
The BMI Awards are annual award ceremonies for songwriters in various genres organized by Broadcast Music, Inc. West has received four Gospel awards, six London awards, six Pop awards and thirty-eight R&B/Hip-Hop (formerly Urban) awards.

BMI Gospel Awards

!
|-
| rowspan="4"| 2021
| Kanye West
| Songwriter of the Year
| 
| rowspan="4" align="center"|
|-
| "Hands On" 
| rowspan="3"| Award Winning Songs
| 
|-
| "On God"
| 
|-
| "Selah"
| 
|}

BMI London Awards

!
|-
| 2006
| "Diamonds From Sierra Leone"
| rowspan="2"| Pop Awards
| 
| style="text-align:center;"|
|-
| rowspan="2"| 2008
| rowspan="2"| "Stronger"
| 
| rowspan="2" align="center"|
|-
| Urban Awards
| 
|-
| 2009
| "American Boy" (with Estelle)
| rowspan="3"| Pop Awards
| 
| style="text-align:center;"|
|-
| 2010
| "Run This Town"  (with Jay-Z & Rihanna)
| 
| style="text-align:center;"|
|-
| 2017
| "That Part"  (with Schoolboy Q)
| 
| style="text-align:center;"|
|}

BMI Pop Awards

!
|-
| 2006
| "Overnight Celebrity" (with Twista)
|rowspan="7"| Award Winning Songs
| 
| style="text-align:center;"|
|-
| 2007
| "Gold Digger" (featuring Jamie Foxx) 
| 
| style="text-align:center;"|
|-
| 2008
| "Stronger"
| 
| style="text-align:center;"|
|-
| rowspan="3"| 2010
| "American Boy" (with Estelle)
| 
| rowspan="3" align="center"|
|-
| "Heartless"
| 
|-
| "Knock You Down" (with Keri Hilson & Ne-Yo)
| 
|-
| 2022
| "Industry Baby" (as songwriter)
| 
| style="text-align:center;"|
|}

BMI R&B/Hip-Hop Awards

!
|-
| 2004
| rowspan="2"| Kanye West
| Top Urban Producers
| 
| style="text-align:center;"|
|-
| rowspan="5"| 2005
| Producer of the Year
| 
|rowspan="5" style="text-align:center;"|
|-
| "Jesus Walks"
| rowspan="5"| Award Winning Songs
| 
|-
| "Overnight Celebrity" (with Twista)
| 
|-
| "Through The Wire"
| 
|-
| "You Don't Know My Name" (as songwriter)
| 
|-
| rowspan="2"| 2006
| "Gold Digger" (featuring Jamie Foxx)
| 
|rowspan="2" style="text-align:center;"|
|-
| Kanye West
| Producer of the Year
| 
|-
| 2007
| "Unbreakable" (as songwriter)
| rowspan="3"| Award Winning Songs
| 
| style="text-align:center;"|
|-
| rowspan="3"| 2008
| "Good Life" (featuring T-Pain)
| 
| rowspan="3" style="text-align:center;"|
|-
| "Stronger"
| 
|-
| rowspan="2"| Kanye West
| rowspan="2"|Producer of the Year
| 
|-
| rowspan="3"| 2009
| 
| rowspan="3" align="center"|
|-
| "Flashing Lights"
| rowspan="2"| Award Winning Songs
| 
|-
| "Put On" (with Young Jeezy)
| 
|-
| rowspan="5"| 2010
| Kanye West
| Top Urban Producers	
| 
| rowspan="5" align="center"|
|-
| "Forever" (with Drake, Lil Wayne & Eminem)
| rowspan="5"| Award Winning Songs
| 
|-
| "Heartless"
| 
|-
| "Knock You Down" (with Keri Hilson & Ne-Yo)
| 
|-
| "Run This Town" (with Jay-Z & Rihanna)
| 
|-
| rowspan="2"| 2011
| "Find Your Love" (as songwriter)
| 
| rowspan="2" style="text-align:center;"|
|-
| rowspan="2"| Kanye West
| rowspan="2"|Top Urban Producers
| 
|-
| rowspan="4"| 2012
| 
| rowspan="4" style="text-align:center;"|
|-
| "All of the Lights" (featuring Rihanna)
| rowspan="14"| Award Winning Songs
| 
|-
| "Niggas In Paris" (with Jay-Z)
| 
|-
| "Work Out" (as songwriter)
| 
|-
| rowspan="3"| 2013
| "Marvin & Chardonnay" (with Big Sean & Roscoe Dash)
| 
| rowspan="3" style="text-align:center;"|
|-
| "Mercy" (featuring Big Sean, Pusha T & 2 Chainz)
| 
|-
| "Party"  (as songwriter)
| 
|-
| 2014
| "Clique" (featuring Big Sean & Jay-Z)
| 
| style="text-align:center;"|
|-
| 2015
| "I Don't Fuck with You" (as songwriter)
| 
| style="text-align:center;"|
|-
| rowspan="2| 2016
| "Bitch Better Have My Money" (as songwriter)
| 
| rowspan="2" style="text-align:center;"|
|-
| "FourFiveSeconds" (with Rihanna & Paul McCartney)
| 
|-
| rowspan="2| 2017
| "Father Stretch My Hands Pt.1"
| 
| rowspan="2" style="text-align:center;"|
|-
| "Pop Style" (with Drake & Jay-Z)
| 
|-
| 2018
| "Bounce Back (as songwriter)
| 
| style="text-align:center;"|
|-
| rowspan="2| 2022
| "Industry Baby"  (as songwriter)
| 
| rowspan="2" style="text-align:center;"|
|-
| Kanye West
| Top Producers
| 
|}

Brit Awards
The Brit Awards are the British Phonographic Industry's (BPI) annual pop music awards. West has received three awards from ten nominations.

!
|-
| rowspan="2"| 2005
| rowspan="2"| Kanye West
| International Breakthrough Act
| 
| rowspan="2" style="text-align:center;"|
|-
| International Male Solo Artist
| 
|-
| rowspan="2"| 2006
| Late Registration
| International Album
| 
| rowspan="2" style="text-align:center;"|
|-
| rowspan="3"| Kanye West
| rowspan="3"| International Male Solo Artist
| 
|-
| 2008
| 
| style="text-align:center;"|
|-
| rowspan="2"| 2009
| 
| style="text-align:center;"|
|-
| "American Boy" (with Estelle)
| Single of the Year
| 
| style="text-align:center;"|
|-
| 2010
| "Gold Digger" (2006 Brit Awards)
| Best Live Performance at the Brit Awards
| 
| style="text-align:center;"|
|-
| 2011
| Kanye West
| International Male Solo Artist
| 
| style="text-align:center;"|
|-
| 2012
| Kanye West & Jay-Z
| International Group
| 
| style="text-align:center;"|
|}

Clio Awards
The Clio Awards is an annual award program that recognizes innovation and creative excellence in advertising, design and communication, as judged by an international panel of advertising professionals. West has received five awards from six nominations.

!
|-
| 2015
| Kanye West x adidas Livestream
| Runway Shows/Presentations
| 
| style="text-align:center;"|
|-
| rowspan="2"| 2016
| adidas + Kanye West
| Partnerships
| 
| style="text-align:center;"|
|-
| Heartless (The Girl on the Train)
| Trailers (Theatrical/Television/ Gaming)
| 
| style="text-align:center;"|
|-
| rowspan="3"| 2017
| rowspan="2"| The Life of Pablo Album Experience
| Innovation
| 
| style="text-align:center;"|
|-
| Integrated Campaign
| 
| style="text-align:center;"|
|-
| YEEZY Season 3 & Premiere of Life of Pablo
| Fashion: Events/Experiential
| 
| style="text-align:center;"|
|}

Danish Music Awards
The Danish Music Awards (DMA) is a Danish award show established by IFPI Denmark in 1989. West has received three nominations.

!
|-
| 2006
| Late Registration
| rowspan="3"| International Album of the Year
| 
| style="text-align:center;"|
|-
| 2012
| Watch The Throne
| 
| style="text-align:center;"|
|-
| 2013
| Yeezus
| 
| style="text-align:center;"|
|}

Designs of the Year Awards
The Beazley Designs of the Year Awards is an annual exhibition and awards honouring the very best in innovative design across six categories: Architecture, Digital, Fashion, Graphics, Product and Transport. West has received one nomination.

!
|-
| 2017
| The Life of Pablo merchandise and pop-up stores
| Fashion
| 
| style="text-align:center;"|
|}

Dieline Awards
The Dieline Awards recognizes the best in consumer product packaging design worldwide, celebrating innovation and honouring excellence in packaging design. West has received one award.

!
|-
| 2012
| Watch the Throne
| Dieline Package Design Award
| 
| style="text-align:center;"|
|}

Dove Awards
The Dove Awards celebrate achievement in Christian music and are awarded by the Gospel Music Association (GMA). West has received one award from three nominations.

!
|-
| rowspan="3"| 2020
| Jesus Is King
| Rap/Hip Hop Album of the Year
| 
| rowspan=3 align="center"|
|-
| Jesus Is Born (as producer)
| Traditional Gospel Album of the Year
| 
|-
| "Follow God"
| Rap/Hip Hop Recorded Song of the Year
| 
|}

ECHO Awards
The ECHO Music Awards began in 1992 by German Phonoakademie, the cultural institute of the German Music Industry Association (BVMI), to recognize "outstanding and successful works of national and international music artists". West has received one nomination.

!
|-
| 2008
| Graduation
| Artist of the Year Hip-Hop / R&B
| 
| 
|}

Esky Music Awards
The Esky Music Awards were awarded annually by Esquire magazine. West received two awards.

!
|-
| rowspan="2"| 2005
| rowspan="2"| Kanye West
| Best Visionary
| 
|rowspan="2" style="text-align:center;"|
|-
| Best MC
| 
|}

FN Achievement Awards
The Footwear News Achievement Awards, established in 1986, are an annual "Shoe Oscars" hosted by Footwear News that honor the industry's best shoes. West has received one award.

!
|-
| 2015
| Adidas Yeezy Boost 350
| Shoe of the Year
| 
| style="text-align:center;"|
|}

Fonogram Hungarian Music Awards
The Fonogram Hungarian Music Awards were founded in 1992 to honor and recognize the musical achievements of performers in Hungary. The awards are presented by Mahasz, the Hungarian music industry association. West has received two awards from five nominations.

!
|-
| 2006
| Late Registration
| rowspan="2" | Best Foreign Rap or Hip-Hop Album of the Year	
| 
| align="center"|
|-
| 2008
| Graduation
| 
| align="center"|
|-
| 2009
| 808s & Heartbreak
| Best Foreign Dance or Pop Album
| 
| align="center"|
|-
| 2014
| Yeezus
| rowspan="2" | Best Foreign Rap or Hip-Hop Album of the Year	
| 
| align="center"|
|-
| 2019
| Ye
| 
| align="center"|
|}

Glamour Awards
The Glamour Awards are annual awards hosted by Glamour magazine. West has received one award.

!
|-
| 2009
| Kanye West
| Man of the Year
| 
| align="center"|
|}

Grammy Awards
The Grammy Awards are awarded annually by The Recording Academy to honor outstanding achievements in the music industry, and are considered the music industry's highest honor. West has received 24 awards from 75 nominations.

!
|-
| rowspan="10" | 2005
| Kanye West
| Best New Artist
| 
| rowspan="77" style="text-align:center;"|
|-
| rowspan="2" | "Jesus Walks"
| Song of the Year
| 
|-
| Best Rap Song
| 
|-
| rowspan="2" | The College Dropout
| Best Rap Album
| 
|-
| rowspan="2" |Album of the Year
| 
|-
|  The Diary of Alicia Keys (as producer)
| 
|-
| "Through the Wire"
| Best Rap Solo Performance
| 
|-
| "You Don't Know My Name" (as songwriter)
| Best R&B Song
| 
|-
| "All Falls Down" (featuring Syleena Johnson)
| rowspan="3" | Best Rap/Sung Collaboration
| 
|-
| "Slow Jamz" (with Twista & Jamie Foxx)
| 
|-
| rowspan="8" | 2006
| "They Say" (with Common & John Legend)
| 
|-
| "Unbreakable" (as songwriter)
| Best R&B Song
| 
|-
| "Diamonds from Sierra Leone"
| Best Rap Song
| 
|-
| rowspan="2" | "Gold Digger" (featuring Jamie Foxx)
| Record of the Year
| 
|-
| Best Rap Solo Performance
| 
|-
| rowspan="2" | Late Registration
| Best Rap Album
| 
|-
| rowspan="3" |Album of the Year
| 
|-
|  The Emancipation of Mimi (as producer)
| 
|-
| rowspan="8" | 2008
| rowspan="2" | Graduation
| 
|-
| Best Rap Album
| 
|-
| "Better Than I've Ever Been" (with Nas, Rakim & KRS-One)
| rowspan="2" |Best Rap Performance by a Duo or Group
| 
|-
| "Southside" (with Common)
| 
|-
| "Stronger"
| Best Rap Solo Performance
| 
|-
| "Can't Tell Me Nothing"
| rowspan="2" |Best Rap Song
| 
|-
| rowspan="2"| "Good Life" (featuring T-Pain)
| 
|-
| rowspan="2" |Best Rap/Sung Collaboration
| 
|-
| rowspan="6" | 2009
| rowspan="2" | "American Boy" (with Estelle)
| 
|-
| Song of the Year
| 
|-
| Tha Carter III (as producer)
| Album of the Year
| 
|-
| rowspan="2" | "Swagga like Us" (with T.I., Jay-Z & Lil Wayne)
| Best Rap Song
| 
|-
| rowspan="4" | Best Rap Performance by a Duo or Group
| 
|-
| "Put On" (with Young Jeezy)
| 
|-
| rowspan="6" | 2010
| "Amazing" (featuring Young Jeezy)
| 
|-
| "Make Her Say" (with Kid Cudi & Common)
| 
|-
| "Ego" (with Beyoncé)
| rowspan="3" | Best Rap/Sung Collaboration
| 
|-
| "Knock You Down" (with Keri Hilson & Ne-Yo)
| 
|-
| rowspan="2" | "Run This Town" (with Jay-Z & Rihanna)
| 
|-
| Best Rap Song
| 
|-
| 2011
| "Power"
| Best Rap Solo Performance
| 
|-
| rowspan="7" | 2012
| Watch the Throne (with Jay-Z)
| rowspan="2" | Best Rap Album
| 
|-
| My Beautiful Dark Twisted Fantasy
| 
|-
| rowspan="3" | "All of the Lights" (featuring Rihanna, Kid Cudi & Fergie)
| Song of the Year
| 
|-
| Best Rap/Sung Collaboration
| 
|-
| rowspan="2" | Best Rap Song
| 
|-
| rowspan="2" | "Otis" (with Jay-Z)
| 
|-
| rowspan="2" |Best Rap Performance
| 
|-
| rowspan="6" | 2013
| rowspan="2" | "Niggas in Paris" (with Jay-Z)
| 
|-
| rowspan="2" |Best Rap Song
| 
|-
| rowspan="2" | "Mercy" (featuring Big Sean, Pusha T & 2 Chainz)
| 
|-
| Best Rap Performance
| 
|-
| rowspan="2" | "No Church in the Wild" (with Jay-Z, Frank Ocean & The-Dream)
| Best Rap/Sung Collaboration
| 
|-
| Best Short Form Music Video
| 
|-
| rowspan="2" | 2014
| "New Slaves"
| Best Rap Song
| 
|-
| Yeezus
| Best Rap Album
| 
|-
| rowspan="2" | 2015
| rowspan="2" | "Bound 2" (featuring Charlie Wilson)
| Best Rap/Sung Collaboration
| 
|-
| rowspan="2" |Best Rap Song
| 
|-
| rowspan="4" | 2016
| rowspan="2" | "All Day" (featuring Theophilus London, Allan Kingdom, & Paul McCartney)
| 
|-
| Best Rap Performance
| 
|-
| "One Man Can Change the World" (with Big Sean & John Legend)
| Best Rap/Sung Collaboration
| 
|-
| Beauty Behind the Madness (as producer)
| rowspan="2" |Album of the Year
| 
|-
| rowspan="8" | 2017
| Views (as producer)
| 
|-
|"That Part" (with Schoolboy Q)
| rowspan="2" |Best Rap Performance
| 
|-
| "Pop Style" (with Drake & Jay-Z)
| 
|-
| rowspan="2" | "Famous" (featuring Rihanna)
| Best Rap Song
| 
|-
| rowspan="2" |Best Rap/Sung Performance
| 
|-
| rowspan="2" | "Ultralight Beam" (featuring Chance the Rapper, Kirk Franklin, Kelly Price & The-Dream)
| 
|-
| Best Rap Song
| 
|-
| The Life of Pablo
| Best Rap Album
| 
|-
| |2019
| Kanye West
| Producer of the Year, Non-Classical
| 
|-
| |2021
| Jesus Is King
| Best Contemporary Christian Music Album
| 
|-
| rowspan="5" | 2022
| "Hurricane"
| Best Melodic Rap Performance
| 
|-
| "Jail"
| Best Rap Song
| 
|-
| rowspan="2" | Donda
| Best Rap Album
| 
|-
| rowspan="2" | Album of the Year
| 
|-
| Montero (as producer)
| 
|-
|}

GQ Awards

GQ Men of the Year Awards
|The GQ Men of the Year Awards are given annually by British men's magazine GQ, celebrating progressive thinkers and people who have excelled in their field. West has received one award.

!
|-
| 2007
| Kanye West
| International Man of the Year
| 
| style="text-align:center;"|
|}

The GQ Most Stylish Man award was established in 2014. Presented annually, sixty-four contestants are entered in a tournament, with the public voting for its winner. West has received two awards from four nominations.

!
|-
| 2014
| rowspan="4"| Kanye West
| rowspan="4"| Most Stylish Man
| 
| style="text-align:center;"|
|-
| 2015
| 
| style="text-align:center;"|
|-
| 2016
| 
| style="text-align:center;"|
|-
| 2017
| 
| style="text-align:center;"|
|}

HipHopDX Awards 
The HipHopDX Awards are annual year-end awards hosted by online Hip-Hop magazine HipHopDX.
West has won twelve awards from twenty-six nominations. 

!
|-
| rowspan="2"| 2005
| Kanye West
| Producer of the Year
| 
| rowspan="2" style="text-align:center;"|
|-
| Late Registration
| rowspan="2"| Album of the Year
| 
|-
| 2007
| Graduation
| 
| style="text-align:center;"|
|-
| rowspan="3"| 2008
| "Flashing Lights"
| Video of the Year
| 
| rowspan="3" style="text-align:center;"|
|-
| Kanye West
| Producer of the Year
| 
|-
| "Put On" (with Young Jeezy)
| rowspan="2"|Collaboration of the Year
| 
|-
| rowspan="2"| 2009
| "Forever" (with Drake, Lil Wayne & Eminem)
| 
| rowspan="2" style="text-align:center;"|
|-
| "Welcome to Heartbreak" 
| Video of the Year
| 
|-
| rowspan="4"| 2010
| rowspan="2"| My Beautiful Dark Twisted Fantasy
| Album of the Year
| 
| rowspan="4" style="text-align:center;"|
|-
| Reader's Choice: Best Album
| 
|-
| "Monster" (featuring Rick Ross, Jay-Z, Nicki Minaj & Bon Iver)
| Collaboration of the Year
| 
|-
| Kanye West
| Producer of the Year
| 
|-
| rowspan="2"| 2011
| Watch the Throne Tour
| Tour of the Year
| 
| rowspan="2" style="text-align:center;"|
|-
| "Otis" (with Jay-Z)
| Video of the year
| 
|-
| 2012
| "Mercy" (featuring Big Sean, Pusha T & 2 Chainz)
| Collaboration of the Year
| 
| style="text-align:center;"|
|-
| rowspan="6"| 2013
| Yeezus
| Album of the Year
| 
| rowspan="6" style="text-align:center;"|
|-
| "Numbers on the Boards" (co-produced with Don Cannon)
| Beat of the Year
| 
|-
| rowspan="2"| Interview of the Year
| Zane Lowe & Kanye West on BBC Radio1
| 
|-
| Kanye West on Sway In The Morning
| 
|-
| Story of the Year
| All Kanye Everything 
| 
|-
| Kanye West Takes Issue With Jimmy Kimmel
| Tweet of the Year
| 
|-
| 2014
| "Sanctified" (Co-produced with DJ Mustard)
| Beat of the Year 
| 
| style="text-align:center;"|
|-
| rowspan="4"| 2021
| Kanye West
| Best Comeback
| 
| rowspan="4" style="text-align:center;"|
|-
| "Jail"
| Best Beat
| 
|-
| "Life of the Party"
| Best HipHop Song 
| 
|-
| "Off the Grid"
| Best HipHop Collab
| 
|}

iHeartRadio Music Awards
The iHeartRadio Music Awards is an international music awards show founded by iHeartRadio in 2014. West has received two nominations.

!
|-
| rowspan="2"| 2016
| "Blessings" (with Big Sean & Drake)
| Hip Hop Song of the Year
| 
| rowspan="2" style="text-align:center;"|
|-
| Kanye West
| Most Meme-able Moment	
| 
|}

International Dance Music Awards
The International Dance Music Awards, established in 1965, are part of the Winter Music Conference, a weeklong electronic music event held annually. West has received three awards from nine nominations.

!
|-
| 2006
| "Gold Digger" (featuring Jamie Foxx)
| rowspan="3"| Best Rap/Hip Hop Dance Track
| 
| style="text-align:center;"|
|-
| 2008
| "Stronger"
| 
| style="text-align:center;"|
|-
|rowspan="3"| 2009
|rowspan="2"| "Love Lockdown"
| 
|rowspan="3" style="text-align:center;"|
|-
| rowspan="2"| Best R&B/Urban Dance Track
| 
|-
| "American Boy" (with Estelle)
| 
|-
| 2010
| "Run This Town" (with Jay-Z & Rihanna)
| rowspan="4"| Best Rap/Hip Hop/Trap Dance Track
| 
| style="text-align:center;"|
|-
| 2012
| "All of the Lights" (featuring Rihanna)
| 
| style="text-align:center;"|
|-
| 2013
| "Mercy" (featuring Big Sean, Pusha T & 2 Chainz)
| 
| style="text-align:center;"|
|-
| 2016
| "All Day" (featuring Allan Kingdom, Theophilus London & Paul McCartney)
| 
| style="text-align:center;"|
|}

Kiss Awards
The Kiss 100 Radio Awards were a 2005 award show presented by UK radio station Kiss. West received three awards from five nominations.

!
|-
| rowspan="5"| 2005
| rowspan="3"| Kanye West
| Hottest Producer
| 
| rowspan="5" style="text-align:center;"|
|-
| Style Icon
| 
|-
| Best Male Artist
| 
|-
| Late Registration
| Best Album
| 
|-
| "Gold Digger" (featuring Jamie Foxx)
| Most Wanted Download
| 
|}

Meteor Music Awards
The Meteor Music Awards, launched in 2001, were awarded for achievements in the Irish and international record industry until their end in 2010. West received one award from four nominations.

!
|-
| 2005
| rowspan="4"| Kanye West
| rowspan="4"|Best International Male
| 
| style="text-align:center;"|
|-
| 2006
| 
| style="text-align:center;"|
|-
| 2008
| 
| style="text-align:center;"|
|-
| 2009
| 
| style="text-align:center;"|
|}

Million Man March Image Award
The Million Man March Award was a 2005 award given to men and women in recognition of their strides and accomplishments in the Black community in the fields of politics, business, religion and entertainment. The award was given to mark the 10th Anniversary of the Million Man March. West has received one award.

!
|-
| 2005
| Kanye West
| Million Man March Image Award 
| 
| style="text-align:center;"|
|}

MOBO Awards
The MOBO Awards (an acronym for "Music of Black Origin"), first presented in 1996, are held annually in the United Kingdom to recognize artists who perform black music. West has received six awards from twenty-one nominations.

!
|-
| rowspan="7"| 2004
| rowspan="2"| "All Falls Down" (featuring Syleena Johnson)
| Best Single
| 
| rowspan="7" style="text-align:center;"|
|-
| Best Video
| 
|-
| "Talk About Our Love" (with Brandy)
| rowspan="2"| Best Collaboration
| 
|-
| "Slow Jamz" (with Twists & Jamie Foxx)
| 
|-
| The College Dropout
| Best Album
| 
|-
| rowspan="6"| Kanye West
| Best Producer
| 
|-
| rowspan="2"| Best Hip-Hop Act
| 
|-
| rowspan="2"| 2006
| 
| rowspan="2" style="text-align:center;"|
|-
| Best International Male
| 
|-
| rowspan="3"| 2007
| Best International Artist
| 
| rowspan="3" style="text-align:center;"|
|-
| Best Hip-Hop Act
| 
|-
| "Stronger"
| Best Video
| 
|-
| rowspan="2"| 2008
| Kanye West
| Best International Act
| 
| rowspan="2" style="text-align:center;"|
|-
| "American Boy" (with Estelle)
| Best Song
| 
|-
| rowspan="3"| 2009
| 808's & Heartbreak
| Best Album
| 
| rowspan="3" style="text-align:center;"|
|-
| rowspan="6"| Kanye West
| Best Hip Hop Act
| 
|-
| rowspan="5" | Best International Act
| 
|-
| 2012
| 
| style="text-align:center;"|
|-
| 2013
| 
| style="text-align:center;"|
|-
| 2016
| 
| style="text-align:center;"|
|-
| 2021
| 
| style="text-align:center;"|
|}

MP3.com Awards
The MP3.com Readers Choice Awards acknowledged artists for their popularity as noted by MP3.com's community of passionate music enthusiasts. West received two awards.

!
|-
| rowspan="3"| 2006
| Late Registration
| Best Album
| 
| rowspan="3" align="center"|
|-
| "Gold Digger" (featuring Jamie Foxx)
| Best Single
| 
|}

MP3 Music Awards
The MP3 Music Award is an annual awards ceremony established in 2007 to celebrate the most popular artists, bands, MP3 players and MP3 retailers in today's world of music. West has received two nominations.

!
|-
| 2011
| "All of the Lights" (featuring Rihanna)
| rowspan="2"| Best Hip Hop/R&B/Rap
| 
| style="text-align:center;"|
|-
| 2012
| "Otis" (with Jay-Z)
| 
| style="text-align:center;"|
|}

MTV Awards

MTV Africa Awards
The MTV Africa Music Awards (MAMAs), established in 2008, honour the best contemporary music across Africa. West has received one nomination.

!
|-
| 2009
| Kanye West
| Best Hip-Hop
| 
| style="text-align:center;"|
|}

MTV Asia Awards
Established in 2002, the MTV Asia Awards gave recognition and awards to Asian and international artists in achievement, cinema, fashion, humanitarian, and music. West received three nominations.

!
|-
| rowspan="2"| 2006
| "Gold Digger"
| Favorite Video
| 
| style="text-align:center;" rowspan="2"|
|-
| rowspan="2"| Kanye West
| Favorite Male Artist
| 
|-
| 2008
| The Innovation Award
| 
| align="center"|
|}

MTV Australia Awards
The MTV Australia Awards was an annual awards ceremony established in 2005 by MTV Australia and ran till 2009. West received four nominations.

!
|-
| rowspan="3"| 2006
| rowspan="3"| "Gold Digger"
| Best Male Video
| 
| rowspan="3" align="center"|
|-
| Best Hip-Hop Video
|  
|-
| Song of the Year
| 
|-
| 2009
| "American Boy"  (with Estelle)
| Best Collaboration
| 
| style="text-align:center;"|
|}

MTV Europe Music Awards
The MTV Europe Music Awards were established in 1994 by MTV Europe to recognize excellence in music videos from European and international artists. West has received three awards from twenty-four nominations.

!
|-
| 2004
| rowspan="4"| Kanye West
| rowspan="3"| Best Hip-Hop
| 
| style="text-align:center;"|
|-
| 2005 
| 
| style="text-align:center;"|
|-
| rowspan="3"| 2006
| 
| rowspan="3" align="center"|
|-
| Best Male
| 
|-
| "Touch the Sky"
| rowspan="2"| Best Video
| 
|-
| rowspan="2"| 2007
| "Stronger"
| 
| rowspan="2" align="center"|
|-
| rowspan="7"| Kanye West
| Best Urban
| 
|-
| rowspan="2"| 2008
| Best Male
| 
| rowspan="2" align="center"|
|-
| rowspan="2"| Best Urban
| 
|-
| 2009
| 
| style="text-align:center;"|
|-
| rowspan="2"| 2010
| Best Hip-Hop
| 
| rowspan="2" align="center"|
|-
| rowspan="2"| Best Male
| 
|-
| rowspan="2"| 2011
| 
| rowspan="2" align="center"|
|-
| rowspan="3"| Kanye West & Jay-Z
| rowspan="2"| Best Hip-Hop
| 
|-
| rowspan="3"| 2012
| 
| rowspan="3" align="center"|
|-
| Best Live
| 
|-
| rowspan="6"| Kanye West
| Best Male
| 
|-
| 2013
| rowspan="2"| Best Hip-Hop
| 
| style="text-align:center;"|
|-
| 2014
| 
| style="text-align:center;"|
|-
| rowspan="2"| 2015
| Best Male
| 
| rowspan="2" align="center"|
|-
| rowspan="2"| Best Hip-Hop
| 
|-
| rowspan="2"| 2016
|
| rowspan="2" align="center"|
|-
| "Famous"
| Best Video
| 
|-
| 2021
| Kanye West
| Best Hip Hop
| 
| style="text-align:center;"|
|}

MTV Italian Music Awards
The MTV Italian Music Awards, also known as TRL (Total Request Live) Awards, are hosted annually in Italy by MTV. They award the best video, performers, and artists of the year. West has received one award.

!
|-
| 2006
| Kanye West
| TRL's Man of The Year
| 
| align="center"|
|}

MTV Millennial Awards
The MTV Millennial Awards, held annually in Latin America, were established in 2013 by MTV Latino to award music artists.  West has received one nomination.

!
|-
| 2016
| Kanye West Announces Presidential Run
| Viral Bomb
| 
| style="text-align:center;"|
|}

MTV Movie Awards
The MTV Movie Awards is a film awards show presented annually by MTV. West has received one nomination.

!
|-
| 2014
| Kanye West
| Best Cameo (Anchorman 2: The Legend Continues)
|
| style="text-align:center;"|
|}

MTV Video Music Awards
The MTV Video Music Awards (VMAs) were established in 1984 by MTV to celebrate the top music videos of the year. West has received five awards from forty nominations.

!
|-
| rowspan="4"| 2004
| rowspan="4"| "All Falls Down"
| Best New Artist in a Video
| 
| rowspan="4" align="center"|
|-
| Breakthrough Video
| 
|-
| Best Hip-Hop Video
| 
|-
| rowspan="2"| Best Male Video
| 
|-
| rowspan="3"| 2005
| rowspan="3"| "Jesus Walks"
| 
| rowspan="3" align="center"|
|-
| Video of the Year
|
|-
| rowspan="2"| Best Hip-Hop Video
|
|-
| rowspan="3"| 2006
| rowspan="3"| "Gold Digger"
| 
| rowspan="3" align="center"|
|-
| Best Male Video
|
|-
| Ringtone of the Year
| 
|-
| rowspan="5"| 2007
| rowspan="3"| "Stronger"
| Video of the Year
| 
| rowspan="5" align="center"|
|-
| Best Director
| 
|-
| Best Editing
| 
|-
| rowspan="2"|Kanye West
| Male Artist of the Year
| 
|-
| Quadruple Threat of the Year
| 
|-
| rowspan="2"| 2008
| "Good Life"
| Best Special Effects
| 
| rowspan="2" align="center"|
|-
| "Homecoming"
| rowspan="2"|Best Hip-Hop Video
| 
|-
| rowspan="4"| 2009
| rowspan="3"| "Love Lockdown"
| 
| rowspan="4" align="center"|
|-
| Video of the Year
| 
|-
| Best Male Video
| 
|-
| "Paranoid"
| Best Special Effects
| 
|-
| 2010
| "Forever" (with Drake, Lil Wayne & Eminem)
| Best Hip-Hop Video
| 
| align="center"|
|-
| rowspan="7"| 2011
| rowspan="2"| "Power"
| Best Special Effects
| 
| rowspan="7" align="center"|
|-
| Best Art Direction
| 
|-
| rowspan="4"| "All of the Lights"
| Best Male Video
| 
|-
| Best Editing
| 
|-
| Best Collaboration
| 
|-
| Best Hip-Hop Video
| 
|-
| E.T. (with Katy Perry)
| Best Collaboration
| 
|-
| rowspan="5"| 2012
| "Otis" (with Jay-Z)
| Best Direction
| 
| rowspan="5" align="center"|
|-
| rowspan="2"| "Mercy"
| Best Hip-Hop Video
| 
|-
| rowspan="2"| Best Editing
| 
|-
| rowspan="2"| "Niggas in Paris" (with Jay-Z)
| 
|-
| rowspan="2"|Best Hip-Hop Video
| 
|-
| 2014
| "Black Skinhead"
| 
| align="center"|
|-
| 2015
| Kanye West
| Michael Jackson Video Vanguard Award
| 
| align="center"|
|-
| rowspan="2"| 2016
| rowspan="2"| "Famous"
| Video of the Year
| 
|rowspan="2" align="center"|
|-
| Best Male Video
| 
|-
| 2017
| "Fade"
| Best Choreography
| 
| align="center"|
|-
| 2019
| "I Love It" 
| Best Art Direction
| 
| align="center"|
|}

MTV Video Music Awards Japan
The MTV Video Music Awards Japan was established in 2002 to recognize excellence in music videos from Japanese and international artists. West has received thirteen nominations.

!
|-
| rowspan="2"| 2005
| rowspan="2"| "Jesus Walks"
| Best Male Video
| 
| rowspan="2" align="center"|
|-
| rowspan="2"| Best Hip-Hop Video
| 
|-
| rowspan="2"| 2006
| "Gold Digger"
| 
|rowspan="2" align="center"|
|-
| "Diamonds From Sierra Leone"
| Best Male Video
| 
|-
| rowspan="2"| 2008
| rowspan="2"| "Stronger"
| Video of the Year
| 
| rowspan="2" align="center"|
|-
|rowspan="2"| Best Hip-Hop Video
|
|-
| rowspan="2"| 2009
| rowspan="2"| "Heartless"
| 
| rowspan="2" align="center"|
|-
| rowspan="2"| Best Male Video
| 
|-
| rowspan="2"| 2011
| "Runaway"
| 
| rowspan="2" align="center"|
|-
| "Power"
| rowspan="2"| Best Hip-Hop Video
| 
|-
| rowspan="2"| 2012
| rowspan="2"| "Otis" (with Jay-Z)
| 
| rowspan="2" align="center"|
|-
| Best Collaboration
| 
|-
| 2016
| "Famous"
| Best Hip-Hop Video
| 
| align="center"|
|}

MTV Video Music Brazil Awards
The MTV Video Music Brazil, commonly known as VMB, was MTV Brazil's annual award ceremony. Established in 1995, the ceremony was discontinued in 2013. West received three nominations.

!
|-
| 2008
| rowspan="2"| Kanye West
| rowspan="3"| Best International Act
| 
| style="text-align:center;"|
|-
| 2011
| 
| style="text-align:center;"|
|-
| 2012
| Kanye West & Jay-Z
| 
| style="text-align:center;"|
|}

MTV Video Play Awards
The MTV Video Play Awards see MTV International recognize the artists who have the most played music videos across the MTV (Music Television) channels around the world. West has received two awards.

!
|-
| rowspan="2"| 2012
| "All of the Lights"
| Gold
| 
|rowspan="2" align="center"|
|-
| "E.T." (with Katy Perry)
| Platinum
| 
|}

MTVU Woodie Awards
The MTVU Woodie Awards were created by MTV in 2004 to recognize the best in music as voted by college students. West has received one award from six nominations.

!
|-
| 2006
| Kanye West - Loop Dreams
| Good Woodie
| 
| style="text-align:center;"|
|-
| 2008
| rowspan="2"| Kanye West
| Performing Woodie
| 
|style="text-align:center;"|
|-
| 2011
| Left Field Woodie
| 
| style="text-align:center;"|
|-
| 2012
| Kanye West & Jay-Z
| Performing Woodie
| 
|style="text-align:center;"|
|-
| 2013
| "Mercy" (featuring Big Sean, Pusha T & 2 Chainz)
| Tag Team Woodie
| 
|style="text-align:center;"|
|-
| 2014
| Kanye West
| Did It My Way Woodie
| 
| style="text-align:center;"|
|}

MuchMusic Video Awards
The MuchMusic Video Awards are annual awards presented by the Canadian TV channel Much to honour the year's best music videos. West has received fourteen nominations.

!
|-
| 2004
| "All Falls Down"
| rowspan="3"| Best International Video - Artist
| 
| style="text-align:center;"|
|-
| 2005
| "Jesus Walks"
| 
| style="text-align:center;"|
|-
| rowspan="3"| 2006
| rowspan="2"| "Gold Digger"
| 
| rowspan="3" align="center"|
|-
| People's Choice: Favorite International Artist
| 
|-
| "Touch the Sky"
| Best International Artist
| 
|-
| rowspan="2"| 2008
| rowspan="2"| "Stronger"
| Peoples Choice: Favourite International Video
| 
| rowspan="2" align="center"|
|-
 |rowspan="3"| Best International Video - Artist
| 
|-
| 2009
| "Heartless"
| 
| style="text-align:center;"|
|-
| 2011
| "Runaway"
| 
| style="text-align:center;"|
|-
| 2012
| "Otis" (with Jay-Z)
| Most Streamed Video of the Year
| 
| style="text-align:center;"|
|-
| 2013
| "No Church in the Wild"  (with Jay-Z)
| International Video of the Year - Group
| 
| style="text-align:center;"|
|-
| |2014
| "Bound 2"
| International Video of the Year -  Artist
| 
| style="text-align:center;"|
|-
| 2015
| "FourFiveSeconds" (with Rihanna & Paul McCartney)
| Best international Video - Artist
| 
| style="text-align:center;"|
|-
| 2016
| "Only One"
| iHeartRadio International Artist of the Year
| 
| style="text-align:center;"|
|}

Music Video Production Awards
The Music Video Production Awards (MVPAs) are annual awards held by the Music Video Production Association. Established in 1992, they honour the best music videos of the year. West has received four awards from ten nominations.

!
|-
| rowspan="4"| 2005
| "Ordinary People" (as director)
| Best R&B Video
| 
| rowspan="4" align:center;"|
|-
| rowspan="3"| "Jesus Walks"
| Best Cinematography
| 
|-
| Best Editing
|
|-
| rowspan="3"| Best Hip-Hop Video
|
|-
| 2006
| "Heard 'Em Say"
| 
| style="text-align:center;"|
|-
| rowspan="3"| 2007
| rowspan="3"| "Touch the Sky"
| 
| rowspan="3" align="center"|
|-
| Best Cinematography
| 
|-
| Best Styling
| 
|-
| 2009
| We Were Once A Fairytale
| rowspan="2"| Best Hip-Hop Video
| 
| style="text-align:center;"|
|-
| 2012
| "Otis" (with Jay-Z)
| 
| style="text-align:center;"|
|}

NAACP Image Awards
The NAACP Image Awards, established in 1967, are presented annually by the American National Association for the Advancement of Colored People to honor outstanding achievements and performances of people of color in film, television, music, and literature. West has received one award from twenty nominations.

!
|-
| rowspan="4"| 2005
| Kanye West
| Outstanding New Artist
| 
| rowspan=4 align="center"|
|-
| rowspan="2"| "Jesus Walks"
| Outstanding Music Video
| 
|-
| Outstanding Song
| 
|-
| The College Dropout
| rowspan="2"| Outstanding Album
| 
|-
| rowspan="4"| 2006
| Late Registration
| 
| rowspan="4" align="center"|
|-
| rowspan="2"| "Diamonds from Sierra Leone"
| Outstanding Music Video
|
|-
| [NAACP Image Award for Outstanding Song|Outstanding Song
| 
|-
| rowspan="2"| Kanye West
| rowspan="2"| Outstanding Male Artist
| 
|-
| rowspan="4"| 2008
| 
| rowspan="4" align="center"|
|-
| rowspan="2"| "Stronger"
| Outstanding Music Video
| 
|-
| Outstanding Song
| 
|-
| Graduation
| rowspan="2"| Outstanding Album
| 
|-
| rowspan="2"| 2009
| 808s & Heartbreak
| 
| rowspan="2" align="center"|
|-
| "American Boy" (with Estelle)
| rowspan="2"| Outstanding Duo, Group or Collaboration
| 
|-
| 2010
| "Run This Town" (with Jay-Z & Rihanna)
| 
| 
|-
| rowspan="2"|2011
| Kanye West
| Outstanding Male Artist
| 
| rowspan="2" align="center"|
|-
| My Beautiful Dark Twisted Fantasy
| Outstanding Album
| 
|-
| 2016
| "One Man Can Change The World" (with Big Sean & John Legend)
| rowspan="2"| Outstanding Duo, Group or Collaboration
| 
| style="text-align:center;"|
|-
| 2018
| "Love Yourself" (with Mary J. Blige)
| 
| style="text-align:center;"|
|-
| 54th NAACP Image Awards | 2023
| City of Gods (with Fivio Foreign & Alicia Keys) 
| Outstanding Hip Hop/Rap Song
|  
| style="text-align:center;"|
|}

NME Awards
The NME Awards are an annual music awards show founded by the music magazine NME. West has received two awards from eighteen nominations.

!
|-
| 2006
| rowspan="5"| Kanye West
| Best Solo Artist
| 
| align="center"|
|-
| 2010
| Villain of the Year
| 
| align="center"|
|-
|rowspan="3"| 2011
| Best Solo Artist
| 
| rowspan="3" align="center"|
|-
| Best Band Blog or Twitter
| 
|-
| Hero of the Year
| 
|-
| rowspan="2"| 2012
| Watch The Throne
| Best Album Artwork
| 
| style="text-align:center;" rowspan="2"|
|-
| Kanye West
| Best Band Blog or Twitter
| 
|-
| 2013
| "Niggas In Paris" (with Jay-Z)
| Best Dancefloor Anthem
| 
| align="center"|
|-
| rowspan="3"| 2014
| Yeezus
| Best Album
| 
| style="text-align:center;" rowspan="3"|
|-
| Kanye West brings Jesus on stage
| Music Moment Of The Year
|
|-
| rowspan="4"| Kanye West
| Best Solo Artist
| 
|-
| rowspan="4"| 2016
| Hero of the Year
| 
| style="text-align:center;" rowspan="4"|
|-
| Best International Solo Artist
| 
|-
| Villain of the Year
| 
|-
| Kanye at the Brits
| Music Moment of the Year
| 
|-
| rowspan="4"| 2017
|-
| Kanye West
| Best International Male Artist
| 
| style="text-align:center;" rowspan="3"|
|-
| "Famous"
| Best Video
| 
|-
| The Life of Pablo
| Best Album
| 
|}

NRJ Music Awards
The NRJ Music Awards are an annual award held by the radio station NRJ since 2000. West has received three nominations.

!
|-
| rowspan="2"| 2009
| "American Boy" (with Estelle)
| Best International Song
| 
| style="text-align:center;" rowspan="2"|
|-
| Kanye West & Estelle
| rowspan="2"| International Group / Duo of the Year
| 
|-
| 2015
| Kanye West, Paul McCartney & Rihanna
| 
| align="center"|
|}

O Music Awards
The O Music Awards is one of the major annual awards established by MTV to honor the art, creativity, personality and technology of music into the digital space. West has received one award from seven nominations, including five separate tweets nominated for Best Tweet in 2011.

!
|-
| rowspan="8"| 2011
| rowspan="2"| Kanye West
| Innovative Artist
| 
| rowspan="7" align="center"|
|-
| Must Follow Artist on Twitter
| 
|-
| Favorite F**k Yeah Tumblr
| F**k Yeah Kanye West
| 
|-
| rowspan="5"| Best Tweet
| rowspan="5"| Kanye West
| 
|-
| 
|-
| 
|-
| 
|-
| 
| align="center"|
|}

People's Choice Awards
The People's Choice Awards is an awards show honoring people and their work in popular culture based on online votes. West has received two awards from six nominations.

!
|-
| 2008
| "Stronger"
|rowspan="2"| Favorite Hip-Hop Song
| 
| align="center"|
|-
| 2009
| "Good Life" (featuring T-Pain)
| 
| align="center"|
|-
| 2010
| "Run This Town" (with Jay-Z & Rihanna)
| Favorite Music Collaboration
| 
| align="center"|
|-
| 2012
| "E.T." (with Katy Perry)
| Favorite Song of the Year
| 
| align="center"|
|-
| 2014
| rowspan="2"| Kanye West
| rowspan="2"| Favorite Hip-Hop Artist
| 
| align="center"|	
|-
| 2017
| 
| align="center"|
|}

Pollstar Awards
The Pollstar Awards are an annual award ceremony to honor artists and professionals in the concert industry. West has received three nominations.

!
|-
| 2004
| rowspan="3"| Kanye West
| Best New Touring Artist
| 
| align="center"|
|-
| 2008
| rowspan="2"| Most Creative Stage Production
| 
| align="center"|
|-
| 2016
| 
| align="center"|
|}

Q Awards
The Q Awards are annual music awards run by the music magazine Q. West has received one nomination.

!
|-
|2015
| Kanye West
| Best Solo Artist	
| 
| align="center"|
|}

Shorty Awards
The Shorty Awards is an annual awards show recognizing the people and organizations that produce real-time short form content across Twitter, Facebook, Tumblr, YouTube, Instagram and the rest of the social web. West has received one nomination.

!
|-
| 2016
| Kanye West
| Best Musician
| 
| align="center"|
|}

Smash Hits Awards
The Smash Hits Awards was an awards ceremony voted by readers of the Smash Hits magazine. The show ran from 1988 to 2005. West received one nomination.

!
|-
| 2005
| Kanye West
| Best Hip Hop Act
| 
| align="center"|
|}

Soul Train Music Awards
The Soul Train Music Awards honour the best in black music and entertainment. West has received four awards from nineteen nominations.

!
|-
| 2004
| Kanye West
| Best New Artist
| 
| align="center"|
|-
| 2005
| "Jesus Walks"
| rowspan="2"|Video of the Year
| 
| align="center"|
|-
| rowspan="2"| 2006
| rowspan="2"| "Gold Digger" (featuring Jamie Foxx)
| 
| style="text-align:center;" rowspan="2"|
|-
| Best R&B/Soul or Rap Dance Cut
| 
|-
| rowspan="3"| 2009
| 808's & Heartbreak
| Album of the Year
| 
| style="text-align:center;" rowspan="3"|
|-
| rowspan="2"|"Knock You Down" (with Keri Hilson & Ne-Yo)
| Best Collaboration
| 
|-
| rowspan="2"| Record of the Year
| 
|-
| 2010
| "Find Your Love" (as songwriter)
| 
| align="center"|
|-
| rowspan="4"| 2011
| Watch the Throne
| Album of the Year
| 
| style="text-align:center;" rowspan="4"|
|-
| rowspan="2"| "All of the Lights" (featuring Rihanna)
| Song of the Year
| 
|-
| rowspan="4"| Hip-Hop Song of the Year
| 
|-
| "Otis" (with Jay-Z)
| 
|-
| 2012
| "Mercy" (featuring Big Sean, Pusha T & 2 Chains)
| 
| align="center"|
|-
| rowspan="2"| 2015
| rowspan="2"| "Blessings" (with Big Sean & Drake)
| 
| style="text-align:center;" rowspan="2"|
|-
| Best Collaboration
| 
|-
| rowspan="3"| 2016
| The Life of Pablo
| Album of the Year
| 
| style="text-align:center;" rowspan="3"|
|-
| rowspan="2"| "Fade"
| Video of the Year
| 
|-
| Best Dance Performance
| 
|-
| 2017
| Love Yourself (with Mary J. Blige)
| Best Collaboration
| 
| align="center"|
|}

Source Awards
The Source Awards was an annual awards show hosted by The Source magazine from 1994 to 2004, honouring Hip-Hop & R&B performers. West received three awards from ten nominations.

!
|-
| rowspan="3"| 2003
| "B R Right" (as producer)
| Single of the Year - Female Solo Artist
| 
| style="text-align:center;" rowspan="3"|
|-
| "Guess Who's Back" (as producer)
| Fat Tape Song of the Year
| 
|-
| rowspan="5"| Kanye West
| rowspan="2"| Producer of the Year
| 
|-
| rowspan="7"| 2004
| 
| rowspan="7" align="center"|
|-
| Breakthrough Artist
| 
|-
| Lyricist of the Year
| 
|-
| Live Performer of the Year
| 
|-
| "Slow Jamz" (with Twista & Jamie Foxx)
| R&B/Rap Collaboration of the Year
| 
|-
| The College Dropout
| Album of the Year
| 
|-
| "Through the Wire"
|  Video of the Year
| 
|}

South African Hip Hop Awards
The annual South African Hip Hop Awards  were established  in 2012.

!
|-
|2021
|Himself
|Best International Act
|
|

Sucker Free Awards
The Sucker Free Awards were a 2011 awards ceremony that honoured the best of the year in hip-hop, throughout seven different categories. West received two awards from three nominations.

!
|-
| rowspan="3"| 2011
| Kanye West & Jay-Z
| The Artist That Ran 2011
| 
| rowspan="3" align="center"|
|-
| Watch The Throne
| Best Album of the Year
| 
|-
| "Niggas In Paris" (with Jay-Z)
|  Song of the Year
| 
|}

Swiss Music Awards
The Swiss Music Awards were created to promote national music scene and at the same time present its cultural diversity. West has received three nominations.

!
|-
| 2008
| Graduation
| rowspan="3"| Best Album Urban International
| 
| align="center"|
|-
| 2009
| 808s & Heartbreak	
| 
| align="center"|
|-
| 2012
| Watch The Throne
| 
| align="center"|
|}

TEC Awards
The TEC Awards honour the most outstanding products in the worlds of music making, live performances, video games, television and films.  West has received two nominations.

!
|-
| rowspan="2"| 2006
| "Gold Digger" (featuring Jamie Foxx)
| Record Production/Single or Track
| 
| rowspan="2" align="center"|
|-
| Late Registration
| Record Production/Album
| 
|}

Teen Choice Awards
The Teen Choice Awards is an annual awards show that airs on the Fox Network. The awards honour the year's biggest achievements in music, films, sports, television, fashion and other categories, voted by teenage viewers. West has received one award from twenty-six nominations.

!
|-
| rowspan="5"| 2004
| The College Dropout
| Choice Music: Album	
| 
| rowspan="5" align="center"|
|-
| "All Falls Down" (featuring Sylenna Johnson)
| Choice Music: Hip-Hop/Rap Track	
| 
|-
| rowspan="8"| Kanye West
| Choice Music: Male Artist
| 
|-
| Choice Music: R&B Artist	
| 
|-
| Choice Music: Breakout Artist
| 
|-
| 2005
| rowspan="2"| Choice Music: Rap Artist
| 
| align="center"|
|-
| rowspan="2"| 2006
| 
| rowspan="2" align="center"|
|-
| rowspan="2"| Choice Music: Male Artist	
| 
|-
| rowspan="3"| 2008
| 
| rowspan="3" align="center"|
|-
| Choice Music: Rap Artist
| 
|-
| "Homecoming" (featuring Chris Martin)
| Choice Music: R&B/Hip-Hop Track
| 
|-
| rowspan="6"| 2009
| rowspan="2"| Kanye West
| Choice Music: Rap Artist
| 
| rowspan="6" align="center"|
|-
| Choice Music: Male Artist	
| 
|-
| "Love Lockdown"
| Choice Music: R&B Track	
| 
|-
| "Heartless"
| Choice Music: Rap/Hip-Hop Track
| 
|-
| 808s & Heartbreak
| Choice Music: Album – Male	
| 
|-
| "Knock You Down" (with Keri Hilson & Ne-Yo)
| Choice Music: Summer Song
| 
|-
| rowspan="2"| 2011
| "All of the Lights" (featuring Rihanna)
| Choice Music: R&B/Hip-Hop Track
| 
| rowspan="2" align="center"|
|-
| rowspan="4"| Kanye West
| rowspan="2"| Choice Music: R&B/Hip-Hop Artist
| 
|-
| 2012
| 
| align="center"|
|-
| 2013
| rowspan="2"| Choice Music: Hip-Hop/Rap Artist
| 
| align="center"|
|-
| rowspan="2"| 2015
| 
| rowspan="2" align="center"|
|-
| "FourFiveSeconds" (with Rihanna & Paul McCartney)
| Choice Music: R&B/Hip-Hop Song
| 
|-
| rowspan="3"| 2016
| rowspan="3"| Kanye West
| Choice Twit
| 
| rowspan="3" align="center"|
|-
| Choice Style: Male	
| 
|-
| Social Media King
| 
|}

The Recording Academy Honors
The Recording Academy Honors Awards were established to celebrate outstanding individuals whose work embodies excellence and integrity and who have improved the environment for the creative community. West has received one award.

!
|-
| 2007
| Kanye West
| Chicago Chapter's The Recording Academy Honors
| 
| align="center"|
|}

The Record of the Year
The Record of the Year was an award special televised by the ITV network. The winner was voted for by the British public from a selection of the year's ten biggest-selling singles in the United Kingdom. West received one nomination.

!
|-
| 2009
| "American Boy" (with Estelle)
| The Record of the Year
| 
| align="center"|
|}

TMF Awards
The TMF Awards was an annual Belgium television awards show broadcast live on The Music Factory from 1995 to 2009. West received one nomination.

!
|-
| 2009
| Kanye West
| Best Urban International
| 
| align="center"|
|}

TMH Awards
The TMH Awards were presented annually by Tmhxone.com, an urban music website. West received one award from five nominations.

!
|-
| rowspan="5"| 2004
| rowspan="2"| Kanye West
| Best New Hip Hop Artist
| 
| rowspan="5" align="center"|
|-
| Artist of the Year
| 
|-
| rowspan="2"| "Slow Jamz" (with Twista & Jamie Foxx)
| Hottest Collab Single of the Year
| 
|-
| Favorite Ballad of the Year
| 
|-
| "Jesus Walks"
| Video of the Year
| 
|}

TRL Awards
The TRL Awards, were presented by Total Request Live. A subsidiary of MTV.

!
|-
| rowspan="2"| 2005
| rowspan="3"| Kanye West
| Best New Artist Award
| 
| rowspan="2" align="center"|
|-
| rowspan="2"| Best Male Artist Award
| 
|-
| 2006
| 
| align="center"|
|}

UK Festival Awards
The UK Festival Awards acknowledge the achievements of organizers and suppliers in the fields of programming, production, innovation, emerging talent, marketing, hospitality, catering and more in the UK festival industry. West has received one nomination.

!
|-
| 2013
| "Niggas In Paris" (with Jay-Z)
| Anthem of the Summer
| 
| align="center"|
|}

UK Music Video Awards
The UK Music Video Awards is an annual award ceremony founded in 2008 to recognize creativity, technical excellence and innovation in music videos. West has received two awards from nine nominations.

!
|-
| rowspan="2"| 2010
| rowspan="2"| "Power"
| Best Visual Effects
| 
| rowspan="2" align="center"|
|-
| rowspan="4"| Best Urban Video – International
| 
|-
| 2011
| "Otis" (with Jay-Z)
| 
| align="center"|
|-
| rowspan="4"| 2012
| "Niggas In Paris" (with Jay-Z)
| 
| rowspan="4" align="center"|
|-
| rowspan="3"| "No Church In The Wild" (with Jay-Z)
| 
|-
| Best Cinematography In A Video
| 
|-
| Best Telecine In A Video
| 
|-
| rowspan="2"| 2017
| rowspan="2"| "Fade"
| Best Dance International
| 
| rowspan="2" align="center"|
|-
| Best Choreography in a Video
| 
|}

Urban Music Awards

Urban Music Awards Australia and New Zealand
The Urban Music Awards Australia and New Zealand were established in 2006 as a means of celebrating hip hop, soul and R&B acts throughout the two countries. Two awards ceremonies were held, in 2006 and 2007.

!
|-
| 2006
| Kanye West
| Best International Act
| 
| align="center"|
|}

Urban Music Awards UK
The Urban Music Awards UK was launched in 2003, and celebrates urban music in the UK. West has received one award from three nominations.

!
|-
| 2008
| "American Boy" (with Estelle)
| Best Collaboration
| 
| align="center"|
|-
| 2013
| rowspan="4"| Kanye West
| rowspan="3"| Best International Artist
| 
| align="center"|
|-
| 2016
| 
| align="center"|
|-
| rowspan="2"| 2018
| 
| rowspan="2" align="center"|
|-
| Artist of the Year (USA)
| 
|}

Urban Music Awards USA
The Urban Music Awards USA was launched in 2007, and celebrated urban music in the USA. The show was discontinued after its second ceremony in 2009. West received two awards from three nominations.

!
|-
| rowspan="3"| 2009
| 808s & Heartbreak
| Best Album
| 
| rowspan="3" align="center"|
|-
| Kanye West
| Best Hip-Hop Act
| 
|-
| "American Boy" (with Estelle)
| Best Collaboration
| 
|}

Vibe Awards
The Vibe Awards was a Hip-Hop/R&B music awards ceremony held from 2003 up till 2007. West received two awards from ten nominations.

!
|-
| rowspan="4"| 2004
| Kanye West
| Artist of the Year
| 
| rowspan="4" align="center"|
|-
| "Jesus Walks"
| Hottest Hook
| 
|-
| "All Falls Down" (featuring Sylenna Johnson)
| Reelest Video
| 
|-
| "Slow Jamz" (with Twista & Jamie Foxx)
| rowspan="2"| Coolest Collabo
| 
|-
| rowspan="4"| 2005
| "Gold Digger" (featuring Jamie Foxx)
| 
| rowspan="4" align="center"|
|-
| Late Registration
| Album of the Year
| 
|-
| rowspan="3"| Kanye West
| Artist of the Year
| 
|-
| Best Rapper
| 
|-
| rowspan="2"| 2007
| VStyle
| 
| rowspan="2" align="center"|
|-
| Can't Tell Me Nothing
| Mixtape of the Year
| 
|}

Virgin Media Music Awards
The Virgin Media Music Awards were an online music awards show. West received one award from four nominations.

!
|-
| 2010
|rowspan="2"| Kanye West
| Loser of the Year
| 
| align="center"|
|-
| rowspan="3"| 2011
| Best Male
| 
| rowspan="3" align="center"|
|-
| Kanye West & Jay-Z
| rowspan="2"| Best Collaboration
| 
|-
| Kanye West & Katy Perry
| 
|}

Webby Awards
The Webby Awards are given for excellence on the Internet, and presented annually by The International Academy of Digital Arts and Sciences. West has received one award.

!
|-
| 2016
| Kanye West
| Artist of the Year	
|
| align="center"|
|}

World Music Awards
The World Music Awards is an international awards show founded in 1989 that annually honors recording artists based on worldwide sales figures provided by the International Federation of the Phonographic Industry (IFPI). West has received two awards from eleven nominations.

!
|-
| 2004
| rowspan="5" | Kanye West
| World's Best New Male Artist
| 
| align="center"|
|-
| 2006
| World's Best Selling Hip-Hop/Rap Artist
| 
| align="center"|
|-
| rowspan="9"| 2014
| World's Best Entertainer of the Year
| 
| rowspan="9" align="center"|
|-
| World's Best Male Artist
| 
|-
| World's Best Live Act
| 
|-
|Yeezus
| rowspan="2"| World's Best Album
| 
|-
| Cruel Summer
| 
|-
| "Black Skinhead"
| rowspan="3"| World's Best Song
| 
|-
| "Clique" (featuring Big Sean & Jay-Z)
| 
|-
| rowspan="2"|"Mercy" (featuring Big Sean, Pusha T & 2 Chainz)
| 
|-
| World's Best Music Video
| 
|}

XM Nation Awards
The XM Nation Music Awards were a 2005 awards show on XM Satellite Radio, voted on by nearly 1.4 million music fans nationwide for nominated artists and categories selected by XM's programming staff. West received one award from two nominations.

!
|-
| rowspan="2"| 2005
| rowspan="2"| Kanye West
| Most Important Established Artist
| 
| rowspan="2" align="center"|
|-
| Urban Artist of the Year
| 
|}

XXL Awards
The XXL Awards recognised the best in Hip-Hop in 2012. The nominees and winners were picked by the XXL staff, excluding the winners in the big five biggest categories which was determined by public vote. West received 5 awards from fifteen nominations. 

!
|-
| rowspan="8"| 2013
| rowspan="3"| "Mercy" (featuring Big Sean, Pusha T & 2 Chainz)
| Record of the Year
| 
| rowspan="8" align="center"|
|-
| Best Video
| 
|-
| rowspan="2"| Best Posse Cut
| 
|-
| rowspan="2"| "I Don't Like Remix" (with Chief Keef, Pusha T, Big Sean & Jadakiss)
| 
|-
| Best Remix
| 
|-
| Kanye West
| Best Dressed
| 
|-
| Cruel Summer
| Best Group Album
| 
|-
| "New God Flow" (co-produced with Boogz N Tapez & Anthony Kilhoffer) 
| Best Beat
| 
|-
| rowspan="7"| 2022
| rowspan="5"| Kanye West
| People's Champ
| 
| rowspan="8" align="center"|
|-
| Performer of the Year
| 
|-
| Male Rapper of the Year
| 
|-
| Artist of the Year
| 
|-
| Producer of the Year
| 
|-
| Donda
| Album of the Year
| 
|-
| Off the Grid
| Song of the Year
| 
|}

Other accolades

State Honors

World Records

References

Awards and nominations
West, Kanye